Tiomesterone (INN, JAN; thiomesterone (BAN); also known as 1α,7α-bis(acetylthio)-17α-methylandrost-4-en-17β-ol-3-one; developmental code StA 307; brand names Emdabol, Embadol, Emdabolin, and Protabol) is a synthetic, orally active anabolic-androgenic steroid (AAS) and a 17α-alkylated derivative of testosterone. It was described in 1963.

References

Androgens and anabolic steroids
Androstanes
Hepatotoxins
Thioesters